The Doctor Who Monsters Books are a series of guide books related to the long-running BBC science fiction television programme Doctor Who.  The books are published by BBC Books.

The main books 
The first three books, released from 2005 to 2007, dealt with the monstrous foes faced by the Doctor in the television series. The fourth book, released in 2008, focused on spaceships rather than monsters, similar to the fifth book, Companions and Allies by Steve Tribe, which dealt with The Doctor's companions. The Ultimate Monster Guide is the sixth, and contains completely revised and updated entries from the first three books.

References 

Books about Doctor Who